Andrés Eduardo Maldonado Manzini (born 9 April 1994) is a Venezuelan professional footballer who plays as a defender for Atlético Venezuela.

Club career
Maldonado is an academy product of Atlético Venezuela and made his debut on 12 August 2012 in a 1–0 league defeat against Zulia. He scored his first goal on 26 July 2015 in a 3–1 win against Llaneros de Guanare.

Career statistics

Club

References

1994 births
Living people
Footballers from Caracas
Association football defenders
Venezuelan footballers
Venezuelan Primera División players
Uruguayan Primera División players
Uruguayan Segunda División players
Atlético Venezuela C.F. players
Boston River players
Miramar Misiones players
Zulia F.C. players
Venezuelan expatriate footballers
Expatriate footballers in Uruguay